Gaston Moch (6 March 1859 – 3 July 1935) was the secretary of the Esperantist Centra Oficejo and a member of the Lingva Komitato.

Moch was born in Saint-Cyr-l'École, Yvelines. He was the son of French Jewish Military officer, Col. Jules Moch, co-founder of "The Club Millitaire" during the time when French Jews were entering the upper ranks of the French Army in the 19th century. During World War I, Gaston would reach the rank of captain. He was also a supportive advocate toward the later release of Capt. Alfred Dreyfus in The Dreyfus Affair trial, in which Dreyfus was falsely accused and sentenced for treasonous acts, aggravated by growing anti-semitism in France. Coincidentally, Moch and Dreyfus were both born and died in the same year.

He was also the Father of French Minister-Statesman, Jules S. Moch

1859 births
1935 deaths
People from Saint-Cyr-l'École
19th-century French Jews
French military personnel of World War I